Bak Man Biu（1921–2007)  was a veteran Hong Kong actor best known for his role as the Patriatch Lok Fai in the TVB drama A House Is Not A Home (1977).

Career

Born as Chew Hong Fook in 1921, during the 1940s, Bak was involved in Cantonese Opera until the 1950s. During the 1950s, he joined the world of Chinese cinema, directing films and collaborating with the legendary director Li Han Hsiang. Bak has acted in many films ever since the 1950s till his retirement in 1996. Bak is considerably one of the best veteran actors in the industry, and is versatile in any roles he plays. He is perhaps best known as the Patriatch Lok Fai in A House Is Not a Home which became a TVB classic.

Bak has also cooperated with many leading TVB actors and actresses then including Chow Yun-fat, Liza Wang and Dodo Cheng.

Bak Man Biu died in 2007 at Manhattan, New York, aged 86.

Filmography

1921 births
20th-century Hong Kong male actors
2007 deaths
Hong Kong people
Hong Kong male actors
20th-century Hong Kong people